= NAC Stadion t Ploegske =

Dutch football stadium

NAC Stadion `t Ploegske
- `t Ploegske
- Interactive map of NAC Stadion `t Ploegske
- Location: Molengrachtstraat; Breda, Netherlands
- Coordinates: 51°34′45″N 4°47′23″E
- Owner: NAC Breda
- Operator: NAC Breda
- Capacity: 3,000
- Surface: Grass

Construction
- Groundbreaking: 1916
- Built: 1916
- Opened: September 17, 1916
- Closed: March 15, 1931
- Demolished: 1931
- Cost: 150 Guilders (€68.08)

Tenant
- NAC Breda (1916 - 1931)

`t Ploegske was a football stadium in Breda, Netherlands. It was used for football matches and hosted the home matches of NAC Breda. The stadium was able to hold 3,000 people, including 150 seats. The stadium was opened in 1916 and demolished in 1931.
